The Paw Paw Cove Site is an archaeological site on the coast of Talbot County, Maryland. Among the finds are fluted projectile points and flakes created during the manufacture of such points.

The site was listed on the National Register of Historic Places in 2009. It is owned by Eastern Shore Land Conservancy.

See also
National Register of Historic Places listings in Talbot County, Maryland

References

Archaeological sites on the National Register of Historic Places in Maryland
Native American history of Maryland
Talbot County, Maryland
National Register of Historic Places in Talbot County, Maryland